The ICC Champions Trophy is a One-Day International (ODI) cricket tournament organised by the International Cricket Council. The 2013 tournament was intended to be the final edition of the Champions Trophy, but it was extended to 2017 due to its widespread popularity. In 2018, the ICC decided to replace the tournament with the World Twenty20 championship to be held every two years, and no Champions Trophy was contested in 2021. However, as part of the 2021 Future Tour Programme, the event was reinstated for the 2025 cycle onwards. In November 2021, the ICC confirmed the tournament would next take place in 2025 in Pakistan, with India hosting the tournament in 2029.

History 

It was inaugurated as the ICC KnockOut Tournament in 1998 and has been played approximately every four years since. Its name was changed to the Champions Trophy in 2002.

The ICC conceived the idea of the Champions Trophy – a short cricket tournament to raise funds for the development of the game in non-test playing countries, with the first tournaments being held in Bangladesh and Kenya. Due to its massive commercial success, the tournament has been held in nations like India and England as a revenue generator for the ICC, and the number of teams has been reduced to eight. The tournament, later dubbed as the mini-World Cup as it involved all of the full members of the ICC, was planned as a knock-out tournament so that it was short and did not reduce the value and importance of the World Cup. However, from 2002, the tournament has had a round-robin format, followed by a few knockout games but the tournament still takes places over a short period of time – about two weeks.

The number of teams competing has varied over the years; originally all the ICC's full members took part, and from 2000 to 2004 associate members were also involved. Since 2009, the tournament has only involved the eight highest-ranked teams in the ICC ODI Rankings as of six months prior to the beginning of the tournament. The tournament has been held in 7 countries since its inception, with England hosting it thrice.

A total of thirteen teams competed in the eight editions of the tournament, with eight competing in the last edition in 2017. ICC Champions Trophy was scrapped keeping in line with ICC's goal of having only one pinnacle tournament for each of the three formats of international cricket. Australia and India have won the tournament twice each (India's 2002 win was shared with Sri Lanka due to the final being washed out twice), while South Africa, New Zealand, Sri Lanka (shared with India), West Indies and Pakistan have won it once each. No non-full member team has ever crossed the first round of the Champions Trophy.

Format 
Up to 2006 the Champions Trophy was held every two years. The tournament had been scheduled to be held in Pakistan in 2008 but was moved to South Africa in 2009 due to security reasons. From then on it has been held every four years like the World Cup. The Champions Trophy differs from the World Cup in a number of ways. The matches in the Champions Trophy are held over a period of around two and a half weeks, while the World Cup can last for over a month. The number of teams in the Champions Trophy are less than the World Cup, with the latest edition of the World Cup having 10 teams whereas the 2017 ICC Champions Trophy had 8 teams.

For 2002 and 2004, twelve teams played a round-robin tournament in four pools of three, with the top team in each pool moving forward to the semi-final. A team would play only four games (two in the pool, semi-final and final) to win the tournament. The format used in the Knock Out tournaments differed from the formats used in the Champions Trophy. The competition was a straight knock out, with no pools and the loser in each game being eliminated. Only eight games were played in 1998, and 10 games in 2000.

Since 2006, eight teams have played in two pools of four in a round-robin format, with the top two teams in each pool playing in the semi-finals. Losing a single match potentially means elimination from the tournament. A total of 15 matches are played in the present format of the tournament, with the tournament lasting about two and a half weeks.

Results

Tournament summary
Thirteen nations have qualified for the Champions Trophy at least once.  Seven teams have competed in every finals tournament.  Seven different nations have won the title. South Africa won the inaugural tournament, India and Australia have each won twice, while New Zealand, Sri Lanka, West Indies and Pakistan have each won once. Australia (2006, 2009) is the only nation to have won consecutive titles. Bangladesh, Zimbabwe and England are the only Test playing nations not to win the Champions Trophy. England has reached the final twice, but lost both times (2004, 2013), Bangladesh reached the semi-finals in 2017, while Zimbabwe has never got past the first round. The highest rank secured by a non-Test playing nation is the 9th rank achieved by Kenya in 2000.

Sri Lanka was the first and only host to win the tournament, in 2002, but they were declared co-champions with India as the final was twice washed out. England is the only other host to have made the final. It has achieved this twice – in 2004 and 2013. Bangladesh is the only host who did not take part in the tournament while hosting it, in 1998. Kenya in 2000, India in 2006, and South Africa in 2009 have been the only host teams that were eliminated in the first round.

Teams' performances 
Comprehensive results for all teams participating in all tournaments for the ICC Champions Trophy is given below. For each tournament, the number of teams in each finals tournament (in brackets) are shown.

Legend
 – Champions
 – Runners-up
 – Semi-finalists
 – Quarter-finalists (ICC KnockOut Trophy 1998-2000)
5th-12th – Group Stage (ICC Champions Trophy 2002-2004)
5th-8th – Group Stage (ICC Champions Trophy 2006-2017)
9th – Pre Quarter-finalist (ICC KnockOut Trophy 1998)
9th-11th – Pre Quarter-finalists (ICC KnockOut Trophy 2000)
9th and 10th – Preliminary qualification stage (ICC Champions Trophy 2006)
Q – Qualified
Apps – Appearances

Notes
 The first two tournaments, in 1998 and 2000, were intended to raise the profile of the game in the host nations, Bangladesh and Kenya.
 India and Sri Lanka were declared co-champions in 2002.

Overview 

The table below provides an overview of the performances of teams over past ICC Champions Trophy. Teams are sorted by best performance, then by appearances, total number of wins, total number of games, and alphabetical order respectively.

 The win percentage excludes matches with no result and counts ties as half a win.

1998 ICC Knock Out tournament 
Won by 

All of the matches in the 1998 tournament were played in Bangladesh at Bangabandhu National Stadium in Dhaka. The tournament was won by South Africa who beat West Indies in the final. Philo Wallace of West Indies was the leading run scorer in the tournament of scoring 221 runs.

2000 ICC Knock Out tournament 
Won by 

All of the matches in the 2000 tournament were played at Gymkhana Club Ground in Nairobi, Kenya. All the test playing nations participated in the tournament along with the finals, involving Kenya, India, Sri Lanka, West Indies, Bangladesh and England. The tournament was won by New Zealand who beat India in the final. Indian skipper Sourav Ganguly (348) was the leading run scorer in this tournament. Venkatesh Prasad (8) was the leading wicket taker. This was the first ICC event won by New Zealand. It was also their only ICC trophy till 2021.

2002 ICC Champions Trophy 
Won by / (Declared Co-Champions)

The 2002 ICC Champions Trophy was held in Sri Lanka, and included the 10 ICC Test playing nations including the newly appointed full member Bangladesh, Kenya (ODI status) and the 2001 ICC Trophy winners Netherlands.  The final between India and Sri Lanka was washed out due to rain twice to leave no result. First, Sri Lanka played 50 overs and then India played two overs before the rain caused interruption. The next day, Sri Lanka again played 50 overs and India played eight overs. In the end India and Sri Lanka were declared joint winners. The teams played 110 overs, but there was no result. Virender Sehwag (271) had the highest number of runs in the tournament and Muralitharan (10) had the highest number of wickets.

2004 ICC Champions Trophy 
Won by 

ICC CT 2004 was held in England and the nations competing included the ten ICC Test nations, Kenya (ODI status), and – making their One Day International debut – the United States who qualified by winning the recent 2004 ICC Six Nations Challenge. The competition was more like a knockout series where teams losing even one game at the group stage were out of the tournament. The 12 teams were divided into 4 groups and the table topper from each group played semi finals. ENG defeated AUS in the 1st semi-final to make their 4th appearance in final of an ICC event. PAK lost to WI in the second semi final, which was a low scoring game. In the final game the WI team under Lara's leadership won a tense match with the help of wicket keeper C Browne and tailender Ian Bradshaw.

2006 ICC Champions Trophy 
Won by 

The 2006 ICC Champions Trophy was held in India with the final on 5 November 2006. A new format was used. Eight teams were competing in the group phase: the top six teams in the ICC ODI Championship on 1 April 2006, plus two teams chosen from the other four Test-playing teams Sri Lanka, West Indies, Bangladesh and Zimbabwe, chosen from a pre-tournament round robin qualifying round. West Indies and Sri Lanka qualified ahead of Bangladesh and Zimbabwe.

The eight teams were then split into two groups of four in a round robin competition.  While Australia and West Indies qualified from Group A, South Africa and New Zealand qualified from Group B for the semifinals. Australia and West Indies reached the final defeating New Zealand and South Africa, respectively. In the final, Australia beat West Indies by 8 wickets to win the trophy for the first time. The venues for the tournament were Mohali, Ahmedabad, Jaipur and Mumbai.

2009 ICC Champions Trophy (postponed from 2008) 
Won by 

In 2006, the ICC selected Pakistan to host the 2008 ICC Champions Trophy.

On 24 August 2008 it was announced that the 2008 ICC Champions Trophy in Pakistan has been postponed to October 2009 as several countries were reluctant to visit Pakistan for security reasons. However, due to the crowded international schedule around that date, and concerns about whether the security situation would have changed by that time, there was widespread scepticism whether it would actually take place in 2009.

On 16 March 2009, an announcement was made that the ICC has recommended that the 2009 ICC Champions Trophy be moved from Pakistan to South Africa.

On 2 April 2009, Cricket South Africa confirmed that it would host the 2009 ICC Champions Trophy from 24 September to 5 October. The Board accepted recommendations from the ICC that Liberty Life Wanderers (Johannesburg) and Supersport Park (Centurion) be the host venues. The details of SA's hosting of the Champions Trophy were ironed out at a meeting between CSA's CEO Gerald Majola and ICC general manager – Commercial, Campbell Jamieson. Majola confirmed that the six warm-up games will be played at Benoni's Willowmoore Park, and Senwes Park in Potchefstroom.

Australia beat England by 9 wickets in the 1st semi-final, and New Zealand beat Pakistan by 5 wickets in the 2nd semi-final, to set up a final that saw Australia beat New Zealand by 6 wickets, in 45.2 overs.

2013 ICC Champions Trophy 
Won by 

England and Wales hosted the 2013 Champions Trophy. England became the only country to host the Champions Trophy twice. Australia failed to win a single game in their group, and were knocked out along with New Zealand in Group A. Pakistan lost all three games in Group B and were knocked out along with West Indies. England and Sri Lanka from Group A, and India and South Africa from Group B, made it to the semi-finals.

India and England won their respective games against Sri Lanka and South Africa comprehensively and the final between the two took place on 23 June 2013. India beat England by 5 runs at Edgbaston, winning their second title, although their first title, in 2002, was shared with Sri Lanka due to the final being washed out. Ravindra Jadeja was adjudged man of the match and he also received the "Golden Ball" for taking the most wickets in the tournament. Shikhar Dhawan received the "Golden Bat" for scoring the most runs in the series and was also adjudged the Man of the Series for his consistent outstanding performances. MS Dhoni became the first captain in history to win all three major ICC trophies – World Cup in 2011, World T20 in 2007 and this edition of the Champions Trophy.

2017 ICC Champions Trophy 
Won by 

In the lead-up to the 2013 tournament, the ICC announced that the 2013 Champions Trophy was to be the last, with its place in the cricketing calendar to be taken by a new ICC World Test Championship. However, in January 2014, that decision was reversed, due to the massive success of the 2013 edition, with the ICC confirming that the 2017 Champions Trophy tournament would take place and the proposed Test Championship was cancelled. England and Wales hosted the 2017 ICC Champions Trophy. England became the only country to host the Champions Trophy thrice, and England and Wales became the only countries to host the ICC Champions Trophy consecutively, also hosting the 2013 edition. Bangladesh replaced the West Indies, who finished outside the top eight in ninth position, in the ICC ODI Team Rankings on the cut-off date. Bangladesh returned to the ICC Champions Trophy for the first time since 2006, and, for the first time, the West Indies failed to qualify.

Security around the tournament was increased following the Ariana Grande concert attack in Manchester, just before the start of the competition. The International Cricket Council (ICC) announced that they would review security concerns. The 15 games played in the tournament were held across three venues – The Oval in London, Edgbaston Cricket Ground in Birmingham and Sophia Gardens in Cardiff. India did not announce their squad by the 25 April deadline due to what it described as "operational" reasons, although this was widely seen as a protest by the Board of Control for Cricket in India (BCCI) in an ongoing disagreement with the ICC over finance and governance. After interference from senior officials, the Indian squad was finally named on 8 May 2017. Pakistan's Shoaib Malik played in his sixth consecutive Champions Trophy.

Rain and poor weather affected 5 of the 15 matches played in the tournament. The top two teams in the ICC ODI Rankings at the time (South Africa and Australia) were knocked out in the group stage, with Australia not winning a single game out of their three. 2015 World Cup finalists New Zealand were also knocked out in the group stage, also not winning a single game. Thus, England and Bangladesh from Group A, and India and Pakistan from Group B qualified for the semi-finals. Pakistan beat England comfortably in the first semi-final, winning by 8 wickets with almost 13 overs to spare to make their first final ever in the Champions Trophy. India beat Bangladesh in the second semi-final, also winning comfortably by 9 wickets, in what was Bangladesh's first semi-final in an ICC tournament.

Arch-rivals India and Pakistan took each other on in the final of a tournament for the first time since 2007, with the final taking place at The Oval in London. It was India's fourth appearance and Pakistan's maiden appearance in a Champions Trophy final. Pakistan beat India comfortably by 180 runs, outclassing them across all three departments-batting, bowling and fielding. Pakistan, the lowest-ranked team in the competition, won their first Champions Trophy title and became the seventh nation to win it. Fakhar Zaman of Pakistan received the Man of the Match award for scoring 114. Shikhar Dhawan of India received the "Golden Bat" award for scoring 338 runs while Hasan Ali of Pakistan received the "Golden Ball" award for taking 13 wickets; he was also adjudged the Man of the Series for his outstanding contribution towards Pakistan's first ICC ODI tournament title since 1992.

The prize money for the 2017 edition of the ICC Champions Trophy was increased by half a million dollars from 2013 to a total of $4.5 million. The winning team got a cheque of $2.2 million and the runner-up got $1.1 million. The other two semifinalists earned $450,000 each. Teams finishing third in each group took home $90,000 each, while the teams finishing last in each group got $60,000 each.

2021 ICC Champions Trophy 
In the lead-up to the 2017 tournament, the ICC had proposed starting an ODI League in 2019, which will most likely lead to the Champions Trophy getting scrapped. Following the 2017 Champions Trophy, David Richardson (the ICC CEO) stated that the future status of the Champions Trophy was undecided, with both a possible Test league and an additional World T20 putting additional pressure of fixtures. In December 2017, the ICC's Future Tours Programme listed the 2021 edition taking place in India. However, in April 2018, the ICC announced that the tournament was scrapped, with the possibility of a T20 World Cup tournament replacing it. 2021 ICC T20 World Cup was originally due to be hosted in India, however, it was moved to UAE due to the COVID-19 pandemic.

2025 ICC Champions Trophy 

On 16 November 2021, it was announced that the 2025 ICC Champions Trophy will be held in Pakistan.

Debut of teams 
Team appearing for the first time, in alphabetical order per year.

Tournament Records

Records Summary

Batting

Most tournament runs

Highest individual score

Bowling

Most tournament wickets

Best figures in an innings

By tournament

See also
Cricket World Cup
ICC T20 World Cup

References 

 
Champions Trophy
One Day International cricket competitions
Recurring sporting events established in 1998
Recurring sporting events disestablished in 2017